Number Seven is the seventh studio album by Will Hoge, released September 27, 2011 by Rykodisc.

Critical reception

Andrew Leahey of AllMusic says, "If it ain't broke, Will Hoge ain't gonna fix it. Number Seven takes most of its cues from the six albums before it, pairing grizzled country-rockers with the occasional world-weary ballad."

Glide Magazine writes, "Acting as his own producer for the first time, Hoge says this album feels truer to his personal vision than any he’s made."

Bill Clifford of PopMatters writes, "Often, you’ll hear young singer/songwriters with a poetic lyrical bent being tagged with "…the next Dylan" comparison. Less often however, is a young rock artist labeled as "… the next Springsteen." Franklin, Tennessee based roots rocker Will Hoge happens to fall as the latter."

Matt Bjorke of Roughstock says in his review that, "Number Seven is clearly evoking classic country/rockers like Neil Young, Tom Petty and The Band but it never, ever feels like Will Hoge is copying or trying to be them. Instead, he’s used their templates to craft another steady, and downright fantastic collection of songs that is as good as anything you’ll hear coming out of Nashville, Los Angeles or New York this year."

Track listing

Musicians

1 – "Fool's Gonna Fly"
Will Hoge – Lead Vocals, Background Vocals, Acoustic Guitar, Harmonica
Adam Beard – Bass, Background Vocals
Adam Ollendorff – Lead Guitar
Devin Malone – Electric Guitar, 12 String Guitar
Pat Buchanan – Electric Guitar
Ken Coomer – Drums
Sigurdur Birkis – Percussion

2 – "Too Old to Die Young"
Will Hoge – Lead Vocals, Background Vocals, Vibraphone
Adam Beard – Bass
Adam Ollendorff – Lap Steel
Devin Malone – Acoustic Guitar, Electric Guitar, 12 String Guitar
Jonathan Hamby – Piano
Ken Coomer – Drums
Sigurdur Birkis – Percussion

3 – "Goddam California"
Will Hoge – Lead Vocals, Background Vocals, Acoustic Guitar
Adam Beard – Bass, Background Vocals
Adam Ollendorff – Pedal Steel
Devin Malone – Electric Guitar
Pat Buchanan – Electric Guitar
Ian Fitchuck – Piano
Sigurdur Birkis – Drums, Percussion
Sarah Buxton – Background Vocals

4 – "American Dream"
Will Hoge – Lead Vocals, Acoustic Guitar
Adam Beard – Bass
Carl Broemel – Lead Guitar
Bucky Baxter – Pedal Steel
John Lancaster – Piano
Sigurdur Birkis – Drums, Percussion

5 – "Gone"
Will Hoge – Lead Vocals, Background Vocals
Adam Beard – Bass, Background Vocals
Adam Ollendorff – Electric Guitar
Devin Malone – Electric Guitar
Kenny Greenberg – Lead Guitar
Ian Fitchuck – Piano
Ken Coomer – Drums
Sigurdur Birkis – Percussion, Timpani

6 – "The Illegal Line"
Will Hoge – Lead Vocals, Acoustic Guitar, Electric Guitar, Hammond B3, High Piano
Adam Beard – Bass, Low Piano
Tom Bukovac – Lead Guitar
Sigurdur Birkis – Drums, Percussion

7 – "Silver Chain"
Will Hoge – Lead Vocals, Background Vocals, Acoustic Guitar, Electric Guitar
Adam Beard – Bass
Kenny Vaughan – Lead Guitar
Sigurdur Birkis – Drums, Percussion

8 – "Nothing to Lose"
Will Hoge – Lead Vocals, Background Vocals, Acoustic Guitar, Vibraphone, Handclaps 
Adam Beard – Bass, Handclaps
Devin Malone – Electric Guitar
Pat Buchanan – Lead Guitar
Jonathan Hamby – Piano
Ken Coomer – Drums
Sigurdur Birkis – Percussion
Adam Ollendorff – Handclaps

9 – "No Man's Land"
Will Hoge – lead vocals, acoustic guitar, handclaps
Adam Beard – bass, handclaps
Adam Ollendorff – lead guitar, handclaps
Keith Gattis – electric guitar
Bucky Baxter – pedal steel
Ben Sesar – drums
Sigurdur Birkis – percussion, handclaps
Gang vocals – Will Hoge, Sigurdur Birkis, Adam Beard, Adam Ollendorff, Brady Beard, Andrew Petroff, Devin Malone, David Wakefield, Charlie Brocco, Kristin Jacobsen, Brittany Wesemann, Kaydee Joyce, Danni Bocker, Jenny Talia

10 – "Trying to Be a Man"
Will Hoge – lead vocals, acoustic guitar
Adam Beard – bass
Vince Gill – acoustic guitar
John Lancaster – piano, Hammond B3
Sigurdur Birkis – drums, percussion

11 – "When I Get My Wings"
Will Hoge – lead vocals
Adam Beard – bass
Adam Ollendorff – electric guitar
Kenny Greenberg – lead guitar
Jonathan Hamby – piano
Jim Horn – saxophone, baritone saxophone
Scott Ducaj – trumpet
Sigurdur Birkis – drums, percussion

Production

Produced by Will Hoge
Engineered and mixed by Charlie Brocco
Additional Engineering by Adam Beard, Matt Rausch, Sigurdur Birkis
Assistant Engineers: Brett Lind, Patrick Miller, Michael Esser
Mastered by Andrew Mendelson

Charts

References

External links
Will Hoge Official Site

2011 albums
Will Hoge albums
Rykodisc albums